Monarchy were a British-based Australian electronic music duo consisting of Andrew Armstrong (also known as Andrew "Friendly" Kornweibel; producer, DJ) and Ra Black (also known as Ra Khahn; vocals, lyrics). Based in London, the duo was previously known as Milke. They have released four studio albums and two extended plays.

History
In November 2009, Monarchy was featured as "Band of the Day" on The Guardian website. Monarchy's debut single "Gold in the Fire" was released on 1 February 2010 on Neon Gold Records, containing the B-side "Black, the Colour of My Heart". They have created remixes for Ellie Goulding, Kelis, Lady Gaga, Marina and the Diamonds, Jamiroquai, Kylie Minogue, Orchestral Manoeuvres in the Dark and Fyfe Dangerfield.

Their first live show was broadcast into space from Cape Canaveral, Florida in June 2010, making them the first band ever to perform live into space. They have since performed at various London and UK venues including XOYO and HMV Forum, and festivals including The Big Chill, Popaganda in Sweden, Bestival, Eurosonic Festival in the Netherlands, Midem in Cannes, as well as Paris, Dijon, Rouen, Amsterdam, and across Europe. In 2011 they performed at Coachella Valley Music and Arts Festival, Hay Festival and Melt! festival, amongst others. Monarchy played the Together Winter Music Festival in London at the Alexandra Palace on 26 November 2011.

After signing to Mercury Records in February 2010, Monarchy was set to release their self-titled debut album that August. However, the duo were dropped by Mercury a few months later, and the album's release was cancelled. Their debut album was ultimately released on 11 July 2011 by independent label 100% Records under a new title, Around the Sun, with a slightly different track listing. The Guardian gave the album three out of five stars and stated that "[t]he lyrics are often arrant nonsense [...] but there are many pleasures here." NME rated the album five out of 10, comparing Monarchy to Hurts, The Sound of Arrows and Steps. Popjustice placed Around the Sun at number fourteen on its list of the best albums of 2011. Their song "The Phoenix Alive" was featured in EA Sports game, FIFA 12 with remix of Kris Menace.

Monarchy's single "Disintegration" was released digitally on 14 January 2013 and features Neo-Burlesque performer Dita Von Teese, who also appears on the track's accompanying music video. The duo released the single "Living Without You" on 28 April 2014. Their extended play Almost Human, was officially released on 8 September 2014, after premiering exclusively on Vibes website on 15 August. Monarchy's second studio album, Abnocto, was released on 6 March 2015 by Hacan Sounds. It was preceded by the single "Dancing in the Corner" on 19 January 2015.

On 27 April 2015, Armstrong announced the split of Monarchy. On 1 June, he announced that the duo had reconciled and would continue touring and creating new music.

Monarchy collaborated with electronic artist Karma Fields on the track "Faint Echoes", taken from the album New Age | Dark Age, released on 2 March 2016.

On August 6th, 2021 the band announced they would be splitting once again. This was accompanied by the release of the bands latest album SYZYGY.

Discography

Studio albums

Extended plays

Singles

Music videos

Remixes

References

External links

 
 

2009 establishments in England
English electronic music duos
English synth-pop groups
Musical groups disestablished in 2015
Musical groups established in 2009
Musical groups from London
Musical groups reestablished in 2015
Remixers